Notophyson is a genus of moths in the subfamily Arctiinae erected by Jean Baptiste Boisduval in 1870.

Species
 Notophyson brotes Druce, 1895
 Notophyson buckleyi Druce, 1895
 Notophyson heliconides Swainson, 1833
 Notophyson praxila Druce, 1895
 Notophyson tiresias Cramer, 1776

References

Arctiinae